Heppel & Ettlich is a theatre in Munich, Bavaria, Germany.

References

 Helmut Schümann. Heppel & Ettlich. Ein Zigarettenautomat packt aus (Kunstmann, Munich; 2006) 
 K. Ossoinig (July 2009). Abschied mit Wehmut. Schwabinger Kult-Theaterkneipe "Heppel & Ettlich" schließt nach 33 Jahren. In: Schwabinger Seiten, Jahrgang 29, Nr. 31, 29. 

Theatres in Munich